Acanthoisis is a genus of deep-sea bamboo coral of the family Isididae.

References

Isididae
Octocorallia genera